Dr. Kishore Shallow is a cricket administrator from St. Vincent and the Grenadines. He is currently the Vice President of Cricket West Indies, President of Windward Islands Cricket Board of Control, and Former President of St. Vincent and the Grenadines Cricket Association. Dr. Shallow is also an alternate director on the International Cricket Council, the world governing body for cricket. 

In March 2019, Shallow ran a successful campaign for Vice President of Cricket West Indies, along with his running mate, Ricky Skerritt, who was elected as President. Few months later, Shallow was also elected as President of Windward Islands Cricket Board. Shallow was chair of the CWI selection task force  that produced the first ever selection policy for Cricket West Indies.  In 2021, Shallow was re-elected unopposed as CWI Vice President for his second term.

SVGCA Presidency 
Shallow was president of St. Vincent and the Grenadines Cricket Association (SVGCA) from 2014 until December 2020. Under his tenure, SVGCA won National Sports Association of the Year twice. He was recognized for his sterling contribution to SVG cricket as president. Shallow was president of the SVGCA when it hosted the first recognized cricket tournament during the COVID-19 pandemic, the Vincy Premier League T10.

Public Figure 
Dr. Shallow became a National Sporting Ambassador in 2019. The announcement came in the Independence Address of Prime Minister Dr. Ralph Gonsalves on October 27, 2019. 

He was also a CARICOM Youth Ambassador, where he served as Vice Dean, Information and Communication.

Personal life 
Shallow was born on 23 January 1984 in St. Vincent and the Grenadines. He has a doctorate from Walden University, a master's degree from University of Wales, Institute of Cardiff, and a bachelor's degree from University of Sunderland. He is married to Lauren McIntosh-Shallow, an attorney-at-law.

References

External links 

 Official Website of Cricket West Indies
 Official Website of SVG Cricket Association
 Official Website of Windwards Cricket

West Indian cricket administrators
Saint Vincent and the Grenadines people in sports
Living people
1984 births
Walden University (Minnesota) alumni
Saint Vincent and the Grenadines expatriates in the United Kingdom
Saint Vincent and the Grenadines expatriates in the United States